Nermai is a 1985 Indian Tamil-language film, directed by R. Krishnamoorthy and produced by K. R. Gangadharan. The film stars Sivaji Ganesan, Sujatha, Prabhu and Raadhika. It was a remake of Bulundi.

Plot 
Gowrishankar is an Economics professor at a college where his younger sister Radha and the spoiled Raja are students. Raja's father Jaikumar is a smuggler that wants his son to lead a virtuous life away from crime. Raja, however, happily uses his father's wealth as a shield to act out at college and has several run-ins with Radha. A desperate Jaikumar appeals to Gowrishankar to help put Raja on the right path and the professor agrees. Raja is ungrateful and conspires to have Gowrishankar fired but soon realizes the errors of his ways. He becomes a model student and falls in love with Radha. Jaikumar is elated and attempts to move away from his own illegal activities. This worries his partners, Seetharam and Pappa Naidu. They seek to protect themselves and set up several plots to neutralize Gowrishankar. Raja and Gowrishankar work together to protect their loved ones and stop the evil men.

Cast
Sivaji Ganesan as Professor Gowrishankar
Sujatha as Parvathi
Prabhu as Raja
Raadhika as Radha
Jaishankar as Jaikumar
M. N. Nambiar as Seetharam
Thengai Srinivasan as Pappa Naidu
Y. G. Mahendran as Govindan
Major Sundarrajan as Headmaster (Guest Appearance)
Vijayakumar as Doctor (Guest Appearance)
Manorama as Professor Kodi Malar
Rajeev as Krishnakumar (Guest Appearance)
Anuradha as Asha
Typist Gopu

Soundtrack

References

External links
 
 

1985 films
Films scored by M. S. Viswanathan
1980s Tamil-language films
Tamil remakes of Hindi films